At the 2005 West Asian Games, the athletics events were held at the Khalifa International Stadium in Doha, Qatar. Contested over three days, from 7 to 9 December, it was the first time that women were allowed to compete in athletics events at the Games. A total of 28 events were contested, of which 23 by male and 5 by female athletes. The event was seen as a test event for the Athletics at the 2006 Asian Games, which Doha hosted the following year.

The competition featured some high level performances by a handful of elite athletes: former World Youth champions Belal Mansoor Ali and Yahya Al-Ghahes won the 1500 metres and 100 metres, respectively, while world silver medallist Mubarak Hassan Shami claimed the half marathon title. On the women's side, 2004 Olympian Ruqaya Al-Ghasra won the women's 100 m. In spite of this, many events featured only a small number of athletes and the overall standard of competition was relatively low.

Host nation Qatar topped the medal table with eleven gold medals, ten silver medals and six bronze medal. Their tally was greatly buoyed by the performances of former Kenya distance runners, including event winners Gamal Belal Salem, Majed Saeed Sultan and Musa Amer Obaid. Kuwait had the second highest number of golds with five, while Iran had the second greatest overall haul (13 medals; four golds). Of the nations competing at the games, only Lebanon and Yemen did not win medals in the athletics.

It was later revealed that 3000 metres steeplechase bronze medalist Mohammed Khassaf of Iraq and 200 metres and women's relay gold medallist Munira Saleh failed drugs test at the event and were banned.

Medalists

Men

Women

Medal table

References

Results
West Asian Games. GBR Athletics. Retrieved on 2011-03-13.
Full results

External links
Official website (archived)

2005 West Asian Games
West Asian Games
2005
2005